Pamiers is a commune and largest city in the Ariège department in the Occitanie region in southwestern France. It is a sub-prefecture of the department. It is the most populous commune in the Ariège department, although it is not the capital which is the smaller town of Foix. The seat of the Bishop of Pamiers is at the Pamiers Cathedral. The current mayor of the town is Frédérique Thiennot, who succeeded André Trigano in 2020 after holding the post for 25 years.

Geography
Pamiers is located on the river Ariège.

The town of Pamiers is famous for its three bell towers and for being the birthplace of Gabriel Fauré, one of the greatest French musicians and composers of the late 19th and early 20th century.  It also boasts awards for Ville fleurie, the equivalent of "town in bloom".
Local facilities include good restaurants, bars, supermarkets, large public indoor and outdoor swimming pools (one of which is 50m).

Pamiers lies in an ancient alluvial plain of the Ariège in the area called La Basse Ariège, noted for its rich fertile soil ideal for agriculture. Pamiers has 17,000 inhabitants, the Appaméens, and is the economic capital of the Ariège, being the most important town in the department.

The town itself dates back to the 5th century. The origin of its name is subject to debate.  A certain school of linguists tends to believe that it was derived from the fact that, when Pamiers was founded, its new inhabitants were given land parcels measured in pams''', from empan (from the Latin "pannus" meaning "piece of cloth"). Originally it was called Ville de Pams.  Another explanation is one involving Roger II de Foix, who had gone to a crusade in the region of Apamea in Syria and who, upon his return to France, gave his castle and domain the name of one of his battles:  Castrum Appamiae, name later on given to the town. The fact that Pamiers' inhabitants are called Appaméens would seem to favour this hypothesis.  In the 18th century a plural stance on the word was introduced making the name "Apamias" derived from ecclesiastical language and also similar to the Occitan language. The Occitan name "Pamias" can be seen on the town sign, alongside the French name Pamiers, as one enters the town via the old route from Toulouse, RN20.

The main square of Pamiers, Place de la République, is paved in red marble. Every week, three large open-air farmers' markets are held, plus a flea market every Sunday morning. Nearby are the old Tour des Cordeliers and the large Church of Notre-Dame-du-Camp''.

Population

Personalities

Pamiers was the birthplace or hometown of:
 Marc-Guillaume Alexis Vadier (1736-1828), politician at the time of the French Revolution
 Caroline Montigny-Rémaury (1843–1913), pianist
 Gabriel Fauré (1845-1924), composer
 Théophile Delcassé (1852-1923), statesman
 Pope Benedict XII, (ca. 1280-1342), bishop of Pamiers in the 1320s
 Swanne Gauthier, basketball player
 Yoann Huget, rugby player

Transportation
Pamiers station has rail connections to Toulouse, Foix and Latour-de-Carol.

See also
1st Parachute Chasseur Regiment, a regiment based in the commune
Communes of the Ariège department
County of Foix
List of medieval bridges in France

References

External links

 Official website 
 Tourist office website 
 

Communes of Ariège (department)
Subprefectures in France
Ariège communes articles needing translation from French Wikipedia